Hans-Peter is a given name. Notable people with the name include:

Hans Peter Aglassinger (born 1963), Austrian industrial designer
Hans Peter Anvin (born 1972), Swedish computer programmer, contributor to Free and open source software projects
Hans-Peter Bartels (born 1961), German politician of the SPD and member of the Bundestag for Kiel
Hans-Peter Berger (born 1981), Austrian football goalkeeper
Hans Peter Boerresen (1825–1901), Danish missionary to India from Gossner mission
Hans-Peter Briegel (born 1955), former German football player and manager
Hans Peter Duerr (born 1943), German anthropologist, author of ten books on the subject
Hans-Peter Dürr (1929–2014), German physicist
Hans-Peter Durst (born 1958), German para cyclist
Hans-Peter Feldmann (born 1941), German visual artist
Hans-Peter Ferner (born 1956), (West) German former middle-distance runner
Hans Peter Fischnaller (born 1985), Italian luger
Hans-Peter Friedländer (1920–1999), Swiss football forward
Hans-Peter Friedrich (born 1957), German politician, representative of the Christian Social Union
Hans Peter Mareus Neilsen Gammel (1854–1931), author and bookseller
Hans Peter Geerdes or H.P. Baxxter (born 1964), German entertainer, frontman of the techno group Scooter
Hans-Peter Gies (born 1947), retired East German shot putter
Hans Peter Hallwachs (born 1938), German television actor
Hans Peter Hammel (born 1947), Swiss journalist
Hans Peter Christian Hansen (1851–1910), New Zealand farmer, hotel-keeper and community leader
Hans Peter Hansen (1829–1899), Danish xylographer who specialized in portraits
Hans Peter Hansen (politician) (1872–1953), Danish journalist and politician
Hans Peter Haselsteiner (born 1944), Austrian industrialist and former politician
Hans Peter Helander or Peter Helander (born 1951), retired professional hockey player
Hans Peter Holm (1772–1812), Danish naval officer
Hans-Peter Kaul (1943–2014), German judge, international law scholar, former diplomat
Hanspeter Keiser (1925–2007), Swiss artist known as César Keiser
Hans Peter Keller (1915–1988), German poet who authored several poem collections
Hans Peter Kerkeling (born 1964), German actor, presenter and comedian
Hans-Peter Knaust (1906–1983), highly decorated Oberstleutnant in the Wehrmacht during World War II
Hans-Peter Koppe (born 1958), German rower who competed for East Germany in the 1980 Summer Olympics
Hans Peter Kraus (1907–1988), Austrian-born book dealer
Hans-Peter Kriegel (born 1948), German computer scientist, professor at the Ludwig Maximilian University of Munich
Hans Peter Kürten, mayor of Remagen from 1964 to 1994 who opened the Peace Museum at Remagen in 1980
Hans-Peter Lanig (born 1935), German alpine skier
Hans-Peter Lehnhoff (born 1963), retired German football player
Hans-Peter Liese or Peter Liese (born 1965), German politician and Member of the European Parliament for North Rhine-Westphalia
Hans-Peter Lindstrøm (born 1973), Norwegian producer
Hans Peter Elisa Lødrup (1885–1955), Norwegian journalist, newspaper editor, non-fiction writer and politician for the Conservative Party
Hans Peter L'Orange (academic) (1903–1983), Norwegian art historian and classical archaeologist
Hans Peter L'orange (officer) (1835–1907), Norwegian military officer
Hans Peter Luhn (1896–1964), computer scientist for IBM, creator of the Luhn algorithm and KWIC indexing
Hans-Peter Makan (born 1960), retired German football player
Hans Peter Manz (born 1955), Austrian diplomat
Hans-Peter Martin (born 1957), Austrian journalist and politician
Hans Peter Matthiae, German Michelin star winning head chef, owner of a restaurant in County Tipperary, Ireland
Hans-Peter Mayer (born 1944), German politician and Member of the European Parliament for Lower Saxony
Hans Peter Minderhoud (born 1973), Dutch dressage rider
Hans Petter Moland (born 1955), Norwegian film director
Hans Peter Murer (1897–1947), Alsatian politician
Hans-Peter Neuhaus (born 1945), former West German handball player
Hanspeter Pfister, German-American computer scientist
Hans-Peter Pohl (born 1965), former German Nordic combined skier
Hans-Peter Reinecke (1941–2005), German actor
Hans Peter Richter (1925–1993), German author
Hans-Peter Schaller (born 1962), Austrian football manager
Hans-Peter Schulze (born 1939), German fencer
Hans-Peter Seidel, computer graphics researcher at the Max Planck Institute for Computer Science and Saarland University
Hans Peter Sørensen (1886–1962), the second Lord Mayor of Copenhagen, holding that office from 1946 to 1956
Hans-Peter Steinacher (born 1968), Austrian sailor and Olympic champion
Hans-Peter Stenzl (born 1960), German classical pianist and music educator
Hans Peter Jørgen Julius Thomsen (1826–1909), Danish chemist noted in thermochemistry for the Thomsen-Berthelot principle
Hans-Peter Tschudi (1913–2002), Swiss politician and member of the Swiss Federal Council (1959–1973)
Hans-Peter Uhl (born 1944), German politician of the Christian Social Union of Bavaria
Hans-Peter Vietze (1939–2008), German Mongolist
Hans-Peter Wild (born 1941), German entrepreneur and lawyer
Hans-Peter Zaugg, (born 1952), former Swiss footballer, current manager of the Liechtenstein national football team
Hans-Peter Zimmer (1936–1992), German painter and sculptor
Hans-Peter Zwicker (born 1960), retired football striker

See also
, a West German cargo ship in service 1956–70
Hans Peters
Hans Peterson

de:Hans-Peter#Herkunft und Bedeutung